Kingfisher Lake Airport  is located  southwest of the First Nations community of Kingfisher Lake, Ontario, Canada.

Airlines and destinations

References

External links

Certified airports in Kenora District